The men's 50 metre freestyle event at the 2004 Summer Olympics was contested at the Olympic Aquatic Centre of the Athens Olympic Sports Complex in Athens, Greece on August 19 and 20.

United States' Gary Hall Jr. defended his Olympic title in the event in 21.93, just two hundredths of a second off the record set by Alexander Popov in 1992. The silver medal was awarded to Croatia's Duje Draganja, who placed behind Hall in 21.94. South Africa's Roland Mark Schoeman completed his full set of medals by adding a bronze in 22.02.

Defending bronze medalist Pieter van den Hoogenband of the Netherlands (22.56), and dual Olympic champion Alexander Popov of Russia (22.58) missed the semifinals. By the following year, Popov announced his retirement from swimming, and became a full-time member of the International Olympic Committee.

Eleven first round heats were raced, comprising a total of 86 swimmers.  The fastest 16 swimmers from this group qualified to move on to the semifinals stage.  After the heats had been raced, the cut-off time was 22.53 seconds.  The 16 swimmers who advanced then raced in two semifinals of eight swimmers each, the results being pooled and the fastest eight swimmers advancing to the final.  The cut-off time to proceed into the final was 22.19 seconds.

Records
Prior to this competition, the existing world and Olympic records were as follows.

Competition format

The competition consisted of three rounds: heats, semifinals, and a final. The swimmers with the best 16 times in the heats advanced to the semifinals. The swimmers with the best 8 times in the semifinals advanced to the final. Swim-offs were used as necessary to break ties for advancement to the next round.

Results

The swimmers with the top 16 times, regardless of heat, advanced to the semifinals.

Heats

Semifinals

The swimmers with the top 8 times, regardless of heat, advanced to the final.

Final

References

External links
Official Olympic Report

M
Men's events at the 2004 Summer Olympics